Bibliothèque Municipale (English:Municipal library) may be:

 Bibliothèque municipale de Besançon
 Bibliothèque municipale de Bordeaux
 Bibliothèque municipale de Cambrai
 Bibliothèque municipale de Colmar
 Bibliothèque municipale de Douai
 Bibliothèque municipale de Grenoble
 Bibliothèque municipale de Lyon
 Bibliothèque municipale de Nancy
 Bibliothèque Municipale de Riom

See also